Asa Turner (June 11, 1799 – December 12, 1885) was an American minister.

Turner, son of Asa and Abigail (Baldwin) Turner, was born in Templeton, Mass., June 11, 1799. On being converted, at a mature age, he turned his steps towards Yale College, where he graduated in 1827.  Immediately on graduation he entered the Yale Theological Seminary, and there early in 1829 united with others in the formation of the "Illinois Association", the members of which pledged themselves to the cause of religion and education in the young State of Illinois.  Turner finished his preparation in 1830, and on September 6 was ordained in New Haven as an evangelist.  The week before (August 30), he married Martha, youngest daughter of Isaac D. Bull, of Hartford, Conn. On November 5, they arrived at Quincy, Illinois, where he organized a Congregational Church a month later.  He continued in abundant and successful labors in this vicinity until July, 1838, when he removed to Denmark, Iowa, where he had two months before gathered the first Congregational Church in that Territory, the Denmark Congregational United Church of Christ. He prosecuted his pioneer work in Denmark and its neighborhood with rare energy and wisdom until October, 1869, when in accordance with his settled intention he retired from active life, at the age of 70. On resigning his pastorate "Father Turner," as he was familiarly called, removed to Oskaloosa, Iowa, where his remaining years were spent in the home of a married daughter. He died in Oskaloosa, December 12, 1885, in his 87th year. 

Of his eleven children, one son was graduated Yale in 1858.

References 
Attribution

External links

Biographical Dictionary of Iowa

1799 births
1885 deaths
People from Templeton, Massachusetts
Yale Divinity School alumni
American Congregationalist ministers
19th-century American clergy